Cholymelan is a 1994 studio album and the first album by Diary of Dreams. It is the only album by the group to release on a label other than Accession Records, having been put out on the Dion Fortune label as Accession Records had not been founded yet. The 1999 re-release is on the Accession Records label.

Track list

References

Diary of Dreams albums
Accession Records albums
1994 albums